CITF may refer to:

 Criminal Investigation Task Force, United States government agency
 CITF-FM, radio station in Quebec